Jabal al-Nabi Shua'ib is a sub-district located in Bani Matar District, Sana'a Governorate, Yemen. Jabal al-Nabi Shua'ib had a population of 4615 according to the 2004 census.

References 

Sub-districts in Bani Matar District